Ahmed Mohammed Malallah (Arabic:أحمد محمد مال الله) (born 1 November 1990) is an Emirati footballer who plays for Al Dhaid as a defender.

Career

Dubai
Malallah started his career at Dubai and is a product of the Dubai's youth system. On 3 September 2010, Malallah made his professional debut for Dubai against Al-Shabab in the Pro League.

Emirates Club
On 27 July 2017 he left Dubai and signed with Emirates Club. On 15 September 2017, Malallah made his professional debut for Emirates Club against Al-Dhafra in the Pro League.

Hatta
On 23 June 2019 he left Emirates Club and signed with Hatta. On 8 November 2019, Malallah made his professional debut for Hatta against Al-Fujairah in the Pro League, replacing Abdullah Abdulqader.

Al-Fujairah
On 11 August 2020, he left Hatta and signed with Al-Fujairah .

External links

References

1990 births
Living people
Emirati footballers
Dubai CSC players
Emirates Club players
Hatta Club players
Fujairah FC players
Al-Ittihad Kalba SC players
Al Bataeh Club players
Al Dhaid SC players
UAE Pro League players
UAE First Division League players
Association football defenders
Place of birth missing (living people)